Buddy is a free monthly music magazine serving the North Texas and Northeast Texas regions. It was first published in Austin, Texas, in October 1972 as a free bi-monthly. Stoney Burns (pseudonym of Brent Lasalle Stein; 1942–2011) and Rob Edleson (né Lewis Robin Edleson; born 1946) were the founders. The magazine's name is a tribute to Buddy Holly (1936–1959), who Burns said "changed my life." Buddy is described as a rock music magazine but, from its beginning, has included news and feature articles about performing artists and events of other genres, namely Texas progressive country, blues, jazz, folk, punk, and garage band music.

History 
Stoney Burns, before co-founding Buddy, published and edited Dallas Notes from 1967 to 1970, an underground bi-weekly newspaper. Christopher Gray of the Austin Chronicle, in 2000, likened Buddy as "the North Texas equivalent of Crawdaddy. Gray later wrote that writers for Buddy magazine who covered the blues scene in the Dallas-Fort Worth area helped resurrect the career of Zuzu Bollin and introduced mainstream music fans to notable regional blues artists, including jazz guitarist Roger Boykin (né Roger Mitchell Boykin; born 1940) and blues singer R.L. Griffin (aka "Fat Daddy;" né Raymond Lewis Griffin; born 1939) and the late pianist Boston Smith, brother of Buster Smith. At its peak, Buddy published editions in Dallas, Houston, and Austin/San Antonio and had a staff of almost two dozen.

Early notable issues included "The Bob Dylan Story," "Plus Kinky Friedman All Star  Issue" (as featured on the cover), January 1974. Buddy chronicled many performing artists before the emergence of their first albums, including, in 1975, Ray Wylie Hubbard, who was already popular as a Texas progressive country artist. That same year (1975), KAFM radio host Chuck Dunaway reported that Buddy, with a circulation of 40,000, was helping spread the positive aspects of progressive country. In 1977, 1978, Buddy was affiliated with KZEW-FM (a Dallas radio station known from  1973 to 1989 as "The Zoo"). By 1979, KTXQ took over Buddy, which had a circulation of 100,000. In 1982, Buddy was the official magazine of the Texxas Jam, a rock festival held at the Cotton Bowl in Dallas. Beginning around 1982, Buddy was issued in tabloid size and format.

Selected personnel

Writers 

 Chuck Flores (né Charles Anthony Flores; born 1955) has been a photojournalist and music journalist since 1975. He is also a musician.  Flores has been assistant editor with Buddy since 1989.
 Tom Geddie (né Tommy Maurice Geddie; born 1946)
 Shawn D. Henderson
 Rick Koster (Richard Koster; born 1955) wrote his first article, professionally, for Buddy in 1978. It was about Sammy Hagar. In 1998, St. Martin's Press published his book, Texas Music. As of 1997, Koster has been writing for The Day in New London, Connecticut.
 Tim Schuller (1949–2012)
 Kirby Warnock (né Kirby Franklin Warnock; born 1952); editor from 1976 to 1982
 Jan Sikes (né Janice Kay Smith; born 1951)
 Jackie Don Loe (born 1965)
 Mary Jane Farmer (né Mary Jane Ewing; born 1940), reporter for Buddy from February 2013 to present
 Lisa Rollins (PhD) (née Lisa Lynette Rollins; 1965–2014) contributed to a feature, "Spotlight on Performers"
 Kathleen Hudson, PhD (née Kathleen Ann Pillow; born 1945) won an award in 1989 from the Texas Press Women's Communication for her story, "You're Gonna Make It After All: Sonny Curtis" (Sonny Curtis). An academic in higher education and freelance writer, Hudson was the founding executive director in 1987 of the Texas Heritage Music Foundation in Kerrville, and served in that position until 2001
 Joe Nick Patoski (né Nicholas Joseph Patoski; born 1951), who, on November 16, 1980, in Austin, married Kris Cummings, keyboardist with Joe Carrasco. Kris was a 1981 inductee of Buddy Magazine's Texas Tornado List (see below).

Selected writers who started with Buddy in 1973 

 Stoney Burns
 Rob Edleson (né Lewis Robin Edleson; born 1946)
 Steve Brooks (né Charles Stephen Brooks; born 1949) (graphic artist)
 Ronald McKeown (né Ronald Houston McKeown; born 1946) (editor)
 Jesus D. Carrillo (né Jesus Domingo Carrillo; born 1952), photojournalist

Selected videography 
 When Dallas Rocked (2013): 64 minute documentary – interviews, photos, and commentary from the people who were there and lived through the heyday of the Dallas rock n roll music scene – during the 1970s and 1980s.  Produced by Kirby Warnock, former Buddy magazine editor.  Warnock narrates.

Texas Tornado List 
The Texas Tornado List, billed as "The greatest players in Texas. Perhaps in the world," is an annual hall of fame roster, since 1978, listing the top musicians in Texas.  The name, Texas Tornados, is also the name of a band founded by 1986 Texas Tornado inductee, Doug Sahm.

Buddy's Music Hall of Fame

Buddy's Texas Music Awards 
Buddy's Texas Music Awards ("The Buddies") is an annual readers poll survey that debuted 1973. The awards were presented at a black-tie event.  The new act categories are chosen by music journalists.

Disambiguation 
 Not to be confused with the South Korean LGBT magazine, Buddy, published in Seoul (from February 20, 1998, to Winter 2003); 
 Not to be confused with the Buddy Potápění ("Buddy Diving"), a bi-monthly (every two months) published in Prague, founded July 2007 (issue No. 1);

Notes and references

Notes

Secondary sources

Primary sources 

1972 establishments in Texas
Biweekly magazines published in the United States
Magazines established in 1972
Magazines published in Austin, Texas
Monthly magazines published in the United States
Music magazines published in the United States